The Sawmill is a 1922 American silent comedy short film directed by Larry Semon and featuring Oliver Hardy. The Sawmill was shot at Hume Lake.

Cast
 Larry Semon as The dumb-bell
 Oliver Hardy as The foreman (credited as Babe Hardy)
 Frank Alexander as Mill owner
 Kathleen O'Connor as The boss's daughter
 Ann Hastings as The owner's daughter
 Al Thompson as The boss
 Rosa Gore
 William Hauber
 Peter Ormonds
 Pal the Dog
 Dorothy Dwan - Undetermined Role (uncredited)

See also

 List of American films of 1922
 Oliver Hardy filmography

References

External links

1922 films
1922 short films
American silent short films
American black-and-white films
Films directed by Larry Semon
Films directed by Norman Taurog
Silent American comedy films
American comedy short films
1922 comedy films
1920s American films